Each Paralympic Games have a mascot, usually an animal native to the area or occasionally human figures representing the cultural heritage. Nowadays, most of the merchandise aimed at young people focuses on the mascots, rather than the Paralympic flag or organization logos.

Noggi and Joggi, the mascots of the 1980 Summer Paralympics in Arnhem, The Netherlands are possibly the first Paralympic mascots. But since the Gomdoori in the 1988 Summer Paralympics in Seoul, South Korea, the Paralympic mascots has been associated with its Olympic counterparts.

List of mascots

See also

 Paralympic symbols
 Olympic mascots
 Olympic symbols

References

 
Mascots
Paralympic